MUFI and Mufi may refer to:
Medieval Unicode Font Initiative, a project which aims to coordinate the encoding and display of special characters in medieval texts written in the Latin alphabet, which are not encoded as part of Unicode
Michigan Urban Farming Initiative, an American 501(c)(3) nonprofit organization based in Detroit, Michigan
 Mufi Hannemann, former mayor of Honolulu